Barrhead Central railway station was a railway station serving the town of  Barrhead, Renfrewshire, Scotland. The station was on the Glasgow and South Western Railway's short-lived Barrhead Branch.

History
The station opened on 1 October 1902, and closed 1 January 1917. It was originally part of a circular service that ran from Glasgow St Enoch via Potterhill, Barrhead Central and Pollokshaws West railway station before returning to St Enoch. The circular service was withdrawn on 1 October 1907, however a service still ran here from St Enoch until the station closed.

Footnotes

References
Butt, R.V.J. (1995). The Directory of Railway Stations, Patrick Stephens Ltd, Sparkford. .
Stansfield, G. (1999). Ayrshire & Renfrewshire's Lost Railways, Stenlake Publishing, Catrine. .

Disused railway stations in East Renfrewshire
Former Glasgow and South Western Railway stations
Railway stations in Great Britain opened in 1902
Railway stations in Great Britain closed in 1917
Barrhead